Anastasia Stepanova (born 22 March 1995), known professionally as Nastya Sten, is a Russian fashion model.

Sten was born in Moscow, Russia. She started her modeling career when she was 17. The first serious work for her became the Proenza Schouler spring/summer 2014 fashion show during New York Fashion Week. 

Fall/Winter 2014-15 season became breakthrough for Sten. She took part in 63 shows, 4 opened and 2 closed. 

Sten appeared in the editorials of magazines such as AnOther, CR Fashion Book, Dazed & Confused, GARAGE, Heroine Magazine, i-D, Interview, The Last Magazine, LOVE , Numéro, Russh, V Magazine, British Vogue, Vogue Brazil, Vogue Italia, Vogue Japan, Vogue Russia and graced the covers of Glass Magazine, Numéro China, Vogue Russia, Vogue Turkey and Harper’s Bazaar UK. For the cover of Russian Vogue, Sten starred with her best friend, top model Sasha Luss. Sten also appeared in the film Anna, in which Luss starred.

References

External links 
Nastya Sten at the FMD.
Nastya Sten at Models.com.
Nastya Sten on Instagram.
Nastya Sten in VK (personal page)

1995 births
Living people
Female models from Moscow
Prada exclusive models